Włodzimierz Chmielewski (born 7 August 1945) is a Polish rower. He competed in the men's coxed four event at the 1976 Summer Olympics.

References

1945 births
Living people
Polish male rowers
Olympic rowers of Poland
Rowers at the 1976 Summer Olympics
People from Przasnysz County
Sportspeople from Masovian Voivodeship